"Jippikayjei" is a song by Finnish rapper Cheek. Released on 11 August 2010, the song serves as the first single from Cheek's sixth studio album Jare Henrik Tiihonen 2. "Jippikayjei" peaked at number one on the Finnish Singles Chart.

Chart performance

References

Finnish songs
2010 singles
2010 songs
Cheek (rapper) songs
Number-one singles in Finland